Murder on the Orient Express is a 2017 mystery crime thriller film directed, co-produced by, and starring Kenneth Branagh as Hercule Poirot, written by Michael Green, and co-produced by Ridley Scott. Based on the 1934 novel of the same name by Agatha Christie, the film also stars  an ensemble supporting cast consisting of Tom Bateman, Penélope Cruz, Willem Dafoe, Judi Dench, Johnny Depp, Josh Gad, Derek Jacobi, Leslie Odom Jr., Michelle Pfeiffer, and Daisy Ridley. The film is the fourth screen adaptation of Christie's novel, following the 1974 film, a 2001 TV film version, and a 2010 episode of the television series Agatha Christie's Poirot. The plot follows Poirot, a world-renowned detective, as he investigates a murder on the luxury Orient Express train service in the 1930s.

Principal photography began in November 2016 in the United Kingdom; it is one of the few productions in recent decades to have used 65 mm film cameras. Murder on the Orient Express had its world premiere on November 2, 2017 at the Royal Albert Hall in London, and was released theatrically in the United Kingdom on November 3, 2017, and in the United States on November 10, 2017, by 20th Century Fox. The film grossed over $351 million worldwide and received mixed reviews from critics, with praise for the performances of the cast and production values, but some criticism for the screenplay and for not adding anything new to previous adaptations. A sequel titled Death on the Nile was released in 2022.

Plot
In 1934, famous Belgian detective Hercule Poirot solves a theft at the Church of the Holy Sepulchre in Jerusalem. The obsessive-compulsive—who seeks balance in life, and considers his case-solving ability to see a lie amid truth to be a curse — wants to rest in Istanbul, but must return to London for another case. His friend Bouc, director of the Simplon-route Orient Express service, arranges a bunk for him aboard the train. The other passengers include: American widow Caroline Hubbard, American businessman Edward Ratchett, with his English manservant Edward Masterman and secretary/translator Hector MacQueen; elderly Russian Princess Natalia Dragomiroff and her German maid Hildegarde Schmidt; Hungarian diplomat Count Rudolf Andrenyi and his wife Elena; physician John Arbuthnot; Mary Debenham, a governess; Pilar Estravados, a Spanish missionary; Cuban-American car salesman Biniamino Marquez; and Gerhard Hardman, an Austrian university professor.

Ratchett offers to hire Poirot as his bodyguard during the three-day journey, having received threatening letters from an unknown party, but Poirot refuses. That night, Poirot hears strange noises coming from Ratchett's compartment, and later sees someone in a red kimono running down the hallway. An avalanche derails the train's engine, stranding the passengers.

The next morning, Poirot discovers Ratchett was murdered during the night after having been stabbed a dozen times. Poirot and Bouc investigate the other passengers as repairs begin. Evidence indicates that Ratchett was murdered by one person, and Mrs Hubbard claims that a man had been in her compartment in the night. Poirot discovers a partially burned note connecting Ratchett to the kidnapping of Daisy Armstrong, a child who was abducted from her bedroom and held for ransom. Though the family paid the ransom, Daisy was murdered nonetheless. Ratchett's true identity is revealed: he was John Cassetti, Daisy's kidnapper and murderer. The shock of her death caused her mother, Sonia, to die after giving premature birth to a stillborn baby; her father, Colonel John Armstrong, then attempted suicide. The family's nursemaid Susanne was wrongly suspected of complicity, leading to her being arrested and subsequent suicide in police custody, only to be posthumously exonerated.

More evidence is found, including a bloodstained handkerchief, and, in Mrs Hubbard's compartment, the button of a conductor's uniform. The uniform is later found, as is the red kimono — in Poirot's own suitcase. Hubbard is suddenly stabbed, non-fatally, in the back but cannot identify the culprit. Poirot discovers many of the passengers have direct connections to the Armstrong family and uncovers their hidden pasts. While interviewing Debenham, Poirot is shot in the shoulder by Dr Arbuthnot, who claims responsibility for the murder, but Bouc stops him from killing Poirot. Poirot realises that Arbuthnot, a former army sniper, never meant to kill him.

Poirot confronts the suspects outside the train, offering two theories of how Cassetti died. The first is simple but does not meet all of the facts: a murderer disguised as a conductor boarded the train at a previous stop, murdered Cassetti, then fled at the stop as the train left. The second is more complex: with every suspect connected to the Armstrongs, Susanne, or her trial in some way, they all had a motive against Cassetti:
MacQueen's father was the district attorney for the kidnapping case, who was pressured into prosecuting Susanne and sending her to prison, only for his career to be destroyed when the truth was discovered after her suicide
Masterman, who is terminally ill, was Colonel Armstrong's batman during the war, and later his valet, who also acted as butler to the Armstrong household
Dr Arbuthnot was Colonel Armstrong's comrade and best friend
Countess Andrenyi (née Goldenberg and real name Helena) was Sonia Armstrong's sister and Daisy's aunt
Count Andrenyi was Sonia's brother-in-law
Princess Dragomiroff was Daisey's godmother, and a friend of her grandmother
Ms Debenham was Sonia's secretary and Daisy's governess
Schmidt was the Armstrong family's cook
Marquez was the Armstrong family's chauffeur
Estravados was Daisy's nurse
Hardman, whose real name is Cyrus and is American, was a former policeman in love with Susanne
Pierre Michel, the train's conductor, was Susanne's brother
Hubbard is revealed to be Linda Arden, a former stage actress and aspiring director, as well as Sonia's mother and Daisy's grandmother.
Poirot predicts that they acted together, which Hubbard confirms, admitting that she planned the murder and had recruited everyone else to help her. All the other passengers and Michel took turns stabbing Cassetti. Debenham wore the kimono, and Arbuthnot stabbed Hubbard without endangering her life, to convince Poirot of a lone killer. Poirot challenges the passengers and Michel to shoot him with a confiscated gun to prevent him from exposing their plot; Bouc can lie, but Poirot, obsessed with truth and balance, cannot. Hubbard grabs the gun and attempts suicide, but it is empty; Poirot wanted to see how the suspects would react.

With the train back on track, Poirot concludes that justice is impossible in this case, as Cassetti deserved death; for the first time, Poirot will have to live with a lie and imbalance. He presents the lone killer theory to the Yugoslavian police, allowing the others to leave on the train. As he disembarks, a British Army messenger asks him to investigate a death on the Nile. Poirot accepts the case.

Cast

 Kenneth Branagh as Hercule Poirot, a world-renowned Belgian detective and former police officer.
 Tom Bateman as Bouc, Poirot's friend, and nephew of the owner of the Orient Express.
 Penélope Cruz as Pilar Estravados, the Armstrongs' Spanish nurse. (This character replaces the Swedish nurse, Greta Ohlsson, and assumes the name of an unrelated character from the novel Hercule Poirot's Christmas.)
 Willem Dafoe as Cyrus Bethman Hardman, who initially pretends to be an Austrian university professor named Gerhard Hardman, but is later revealed to be Susanne's American lover.
 Judi Dench as Princess Natalia Dragomiroff, Daisy's godmother and close friend of Sonia.
 Johnny Depp as John Cassetti, alias Edward Ratchett, a famous gangster, and Daisy Armstrong's kidnapper and murderer.
 Josh Gad as Hector MacQueen, Ratchett's secretary. His father was the prosecutor of Susanne. 
 Derek Jacobi as Edward Henry Masterman, Ratchett's valet and butler, Col. Armstrong's former valet.
 Leslie Odom Jr. as Dr Arbuthnot, Mary's secret lover, who is also a former army sniper and Col. Armstrong's close friend. (This character is an amalgamation of two characters from the novel, Col. Arbuthnot & Dr Constantine.)
 Michelle Pfeiffer as Linda Arden, alias Caroline Hubbard, Sonia and Helena’s mother and Daisy's grandmother.
 Daisy Ridley as Mary Debenham, Sonia's personal secretary and Daisy's governess.
 Marwan Kenzari as Pierre Michel, the conductor and brother of Susanne, the Armstrongs’ former maid who hanged herself in prison after being wrongly accused of killing Daisy. In the novel, she threw herself out a window. 
 Olivia Colman as Hildegarde Schmidt, Natalia's maid and the Armstrongs' cook.
 Lucy Boynton as Countess Helena Andrenyi, Sonia's younger sister.
 Manuel Garcia-Rulfo as Biniamino Marquez, a car salesman and the Armstrongs' chauffeur. (This character replaces Antonio Foscarelli.)
 Sergei Polunin as Count Rudolph Andrenyi, Helena's husband.

Additionally, Phil Dunster portrays Col. John Armstrong, Daisy's father, while Miranda Raison portrays Sonia Armstrong, Daisy's mother.

Production 
20th Century Fox announced the project in December 2013. Michael Green wrote the screenplay for a new film adaptation of Murder on the Orient Express. On June 16, 2015, it was reported Fox was in talks with Kenneth Branagh to direct. On November 20, 2015, it was announced that Branagh would both direct the film and star in the role of detective Hercule Poirot. He later said that he "enjoyed finding the sort of obsessive-compulsive in [Poirot] rather than the dandy."

In June 2016, Angelina Jolie entered into "talks" to join the cast of the film, in the role of Mrs Caroline Hubbard. However, it was later reported that Jolie had passed on the role and that Charlize Theron, among others, was in consideration for the role. In August 2016, Leslie Odom Jr. joined the cast. In September 2016, Tom Bateman, Johnny Depp, Michelle Pfeiffer, Daisy Ridley, Michael Peña, Judi Dench, Lucy Boynton and Derek Jacobi joined the cast. In October 2016, Josh Gad and Marwan Kenzari joined the cast. In November 2016, Penélope Cruz joined the cast. In December 2016, Sergei Polunin joined the cast. In January 2017, Willem Dafoe and Manuel Garcia-Rulfo joined the cast with the latter replacing Peña, who had dropped out of the project.

Principal photography on the film began on November 22, 2016, in the United Kingdom, and concluded in May 2017. It used some of the same 65mm film cameras as Christopher Nolan's Dunkirk, which Branagh had acted in shortly before the production. The two were among the very few to be shot on 65 mm film since Branagh's Hamlet in 1996, and the only ones released in 2017. While in post-production, Branagh "was Skyped in from thousands of miles away" to watch Pfeiffer record an original song called "Never Forget" for the film's finale. "As soon as we added it on to the end of the film, it joined seamlessly and gave a moment of reflection and consideration that the film needed and wanted," said Branagh.

Release
A first look at the film and cast was released on May 3, 2017, in an exclusive article by Entertainment Weekly.

Murder on the Orient Express was released in the United Kingdom on November 4, 2017, and in the United States on November 10, 2017, by 20th Century Fox. The film was released on digital HD on February 20, 2018, and on Ultra HD Blu-ray, DVD and Blu-ray on February 27, 2018.

Reception

Box office 
Murder on the Orient Express grossed $102.8 million in North America and $250 million elsewhere for a worldwide total of $352.8 million, against a production budget of $55 million.

In the United States and Canada, Murder on the Orient Express was released alongside Daddy's Home 2, and was projected to gross around $20 million from 3,341 theaters in its opening weekend. The film made $10.9 million on its first day, including $1.6 million from Thursday night previews at 2,775 theaters. It ended up grossing $28.7 million, finishing third at the box office, behind holdover Thor: Ragnarok, and Daddy's Home 2. On the film's opening weekend, 51% of the audience was over the age of 35. In its second weekend, the film took in $13.8 million (a drop of 51.9%), finishing fifth, behind Justice League, Wonder, Thor: Ragnarok and Daddy's Home 2.

Critical response 
On review aggregator Rotten Tomatoes, the film has an approval rating of 61% based on 300 reviews, with an average rating of 6.1/10. The website's critical consensus reads: "Stylish production and an all-star ensemble keep this Murder on the Orient Express from running off the rails, even if it never quite builds up to its classic predecessor's illustrious head of steam." On Metacritic the film has a weighted average score of 52 out of 100, based on 46 critics, indicating "mixed or average reviews". Audiences polled by CinemaScore gave the film an average grade of "B" on an A+ to F scale.

Leah Greenblatt of Entertainment Weekly gave the film a B+, calling it "a lushly old-fashioned adaptation wrapped in a veritable turducken of pearls, monocles, and international movie stars." Blake Goble of Consequence of Sound said, "Handsomely staged, exceptionally well-cast, and reasonably faithful, Branagh has revived Murder on the Orient Express in a highly pleasing fashion." Trace Thurman of Bloody Disgusting gave the film three and a half skulls and said, "For those looking for an involving murder mystery that is respectful of its source material and filled with an all-star cast, look no further than Murder on the Orient Express." Matt Goldberg of Collider gave the film a B−, calling it a "handsomely crafted production," albeit one that "falls apart at the climax of the film." Jo Livingstone of The New Republic praised the film's "stylized gorgeousness," but wrote that Branagh's change of "Poirot's fussiness ... into obsessive compulsive tendencies" was "less distinct and, ultimately, less interesting".

On the negative side, Matthew Jacobs of The Huffington Post was impressed by the cast, but ultimately felt "Agatha Christie's whodunit has no steam." Peter Travers of Rolling Stone found that there were many dull moments and that the film was a needless remake. Richard Roeper of the Chicago Sun-Times gave the film two and a half stars, and stated that he felt it focused too much on Poirot to the detriment of the other characters, adding, "Never let it be said the director misses an opportunity to place his star front and center, unfortunately relegating just about everyone else in the obligatory international all-star cast to a paper-thin character with one or at most two defining personality traits." Ignatiy Vishnevetsky of The A.V. Club rated the film a C+ and complained that Branagh's "erratic direction—more interested in cut glass and overhead shots than in suspicions and uncertainties—bungles both the perfect puzzle logic of the crime and its devious solution." Christopher Orr of The Atlantic said the film was "visually sumptuous yet otherwise inert" and summed up, "Murder on the Orient Express is not a bad movie per se, merely one that feels self-indulgent and thoroughly unnecessary."

Accolades

Sequel

In 2015, Christie's great-grandson James Prichard, chairman of Agatha Christie Limited, expressed enthusiasm for sequels, citing the positive collaboration with Kenneth Branagh and the production team. In May 2017, Branagh expressed interest in further installments if the film were successful. On November 20, 2017, 20th Century Fox announced that a sequel, Death on the Nile, based on the 1937 novel of the same name, was in active development, with Michael Green, screenwriter of the first film, returning to write the screenplay. Death on the Nile underwent several delays, due in part to Disney's acquisition of 20th Century Fox and the COVID-19 pandemic. It was theatrically released on February 11, 2022.

References

External links
 
 
 
 

2017 films
2017 crime thriller films
2010s mystery thriller films
20th Century Fox films
American crime thriller films
American detective films
American films about revenge
American mystery thriller films
Avalanches in film
Fiction about child murder
Films based on British novels
Films based on crime novels
Films based on Hercule Poirot books
Films directed by Kenneth Branagh
Films produced by Simon Kinberg
Films scored by Patrick Doyle
Films set in 1934
Films set in London
Films set in Yugoslavia
Films set on the Orient Express
Films set on trains
Films shot in London
Films with screenplays by Michael Green (writer)
Maltese thriller films
Murder mystery films
Scott Free Productions films
2010s English-language films
2010s American films
Murder on the Orient Express